Pyatakov is a rural locality (a village) in Niginskoye Rural Settlement, Nikolsky District, Vologda Oblast, Russia. The population was 30 as of 2002.

Geography 
The distance to Nikolsk is 32 km, to Nigino is 14 km. Yelkhovka is the nearest rural locality.

References 

Rural localities in Nikolsky District, Vologda Oblast